Daniel Paul Hamilton (born August 17, 1976) is an American politician. He was a member of the South Carolina House of Representatives from the 20th District, serving from 1996 to 2018. He is a member of the Republican Party.

Early life and career
Daniel Hamilton was born in Miami, Florida, on August 17, 1976, to Glenn and Joan Hamilton. He graduated with a bachelor's degree in organizational communication from Bob Jones University in 1998. In 1995, Dan won election to replace his father, Glenn Hamilton, who was retiring from the State House. He served as the Speaker of the Student Legislature of South Carolina from 1997-1998 and as field representative for U.S. Representative Jim DeMint from 1999-2001.

2018 U.S. House campaign

Hamilton ran in the 2018 Republican primary to replace retiring Republican incumbent Trey Gowdy in South Carolina's 4th congressional district. He lost during the initial round.

References

Living people
1976 births
People from Greenville County, South Carolina
Bob Jones University alumni
Republican Party members of the South Carolina House of Representatives
21st-century American politicians
Politicians from Miami